Francisco José Mejía (born October 27, 1995) is a Dominican professional baseball catcher for the Tampa Bay Rays of Major League Baseball (MLB). He has previously played in MLB for the Cleveland Indians and San Diego Padres.

Career
Mejía was born in Bani, Dominican Republic. He studied at Las Carreras de Baní. Mejía is represented by the sports agency Independent Sports & Entertainment (ISE).

Cleveland Indians
In July 2012, Mejía signed with the Cleveland Indians for over $100,000 as a non-drafted international free agent. He made his professional debut in 2013 with the Arizona Indians of the Rookie-level Arizona League with whom he spent the season, batting .205 with four home runs and 24 RBIs in 30 games. In 2014, he played for the Mahoning Valley Scrappers of the Class A-Short Season New York-Penn League where he posted a .282 batting average with two home runs and 36 RBIs in 66 games. He spent 2015 with the Lake County Captains of the Class A Midwest League; there, he batted .243/.324/.345 with nine home runs and 53 RBIs.

In 2016, Mejía began the season again with Lake County, and was promoted to the Lynchburg Hillcats of the Class A-Advanced Carolina League in June. At the time of his promotion, Mejía was in the midst of a hitting streak that had reached 24 games. His hitting streak lasted for 50 games, and was the fourth-longest streak in the history of Minor League Baseball. He was reported to be involved in a trade to the Milwaukee Brewers for Jonathan Lucroy; however, the trade fell apart after Lucroy would not waive his no-trade clause. In 102 total games between Lake County and Lynchburg, he posted a combined .342 batting average with 11 home runs, 80 RBIs and an .896 OPS. The Indians added him to their 40-man roster after the season. In 2016-17 he played for the Estrellas de Oriente of the Dominican Winter League, and batted .227/.217/.227 in nine games.

Mejía began the 2017 season with the Akron RubberDucks of the Class AA Eastern League. After batting .297 with 14 home runs and 52 RBIs, he was called up to the major leagues for the first time on September 1, 2017. In the Major Leagues for the 2017 season, he batted .154/.214/.154 in 11 games.

MLB.com ranked Mejía as Cleveland's top prospect going into the 2018 season. He began the 2018 season with the Columbus Clippers of the Class AAA International League.

San Diego Padres
Mejía was traded to the San Diego Padres in exchange for Brad Hand and Adam Cimber on July 19, 2018. The Padres assigned him to the El Paso Chihuahuas of the Pacific Coast League. The Padres recalled Mejía from the minors on September 4, 2018.

In 2019, he had the best arm of all major league catchers (88.6). Mejia struggled to find playing time throughout his time in San Diego, putting up a slash line of 185/.241/.389 in just 20 games in 2018. While he received more playing time in 2019, he was given a chance to prove himself and he was around league average, putting up an OPS+ at 99.
In the 2020 season, Mejia played in just 17 games, while being on the injured list for a month with a bruised thumb. He struggled in 2020, putting up a .322 OPS and mustering just 3 hits in 39 at bats.

Tampa Bay Rays
On December 29, 2020, Mejía, along with prospects Luis Patiño, Blake Hunt, and Cole Wilcox, was traded to the Tampa Bay Rays in exchange for Blake Snell.

References

External links

1995 births
Living people
Akron RubberDucks players
Arizona League Indians players
Cleveland Indians players
Dominican Republic expatriate baseball players in the United States
El Paso Chihuahuas players
Estrellas Orientales players
Lake County Captains players
Lynchburg Hillcats players
Major League Baseball catchers
Major League Baseball players from the Dominican Republic
Mahoning Valley Scrappers players
San Diego Padres players
Tampa Bay Rays players
2023 World Baseball Classic players